Chad Williams may refer to:
 Chad Williams (safety) (born 1979), American football safety
 Chad Williams (wide receiver) (born 1994), American football wide receiver
 Chad Williams (cricketer) (born 1995), Barbadian cricketer